The 2016–17 Mestis season was the 17th season of Mestis, the second highest level of ice hockey in Finland after Liiga. Previous seasons champion Jukurit got a place in the Liiga. IPK got promoted from Suomi-sarja at the end of last season. Espoo United got a place in Mestis after Espoo Blues suffered bankruptcy and the league was exceptionally played with 13 teams.

At the end of the season SaPKo won both the regular season and the playoffs. Hokki and IPK retained their place in Mestis, while JYP-Akatemia was relegated. Hokki faced bankruptcy during the off-season and thus Imatran Ketterä were awarded a place in Mestis for the next season.

Clubs

Regular season
Top eight advance to the Mestis playoffs while the bottom two face the top two teams from Suomi-sarja for a relegation playoff. Since the highest series of Finnish hockey is a closed series no team will be promoted to Liiga.

Rules for classification: 1) Points; 2) Goal difference; 3) Goals scored; 4) Head-to-head points; 5) Penalty minutes.

Playoffs
Playoffs are being played in three stages. Each stage is a best-of-7 series. The teams are reseeded after the quarterfinals, so that the best team by regular season performance to make the semifinals faces the worst team in the semifinals.

Bracket

Relegation qualification
Bottom three teams of Mestis face the top two teams of Suomi-Sarja in a relegation qualification, where two top teams will get a place in Mestis for the next season. Each team will play against each other twice.

Rules for classification: 1) Points; 2) Goal difference; 3) Goals scored; 4) Head-to-head points; 5) Penalty minutes.

See also
2016–17 Liiga season

References

Mestis seasons
Mestis
Mestis